is a former Japanese football player.

Playing career
Kawamura was born in Yaizu on December 1, 1980. After graduating from high school, he joined the J2 League club Consadole Sapporo in 1999. Although he played for two seasons, he was not in many matches. In 2001, he moved to Mito HollyHock on loan. He became a regular player and played often as offensive midfielder. In 2002, he moved to Avispa Fukuoka on loan. However he did not play much. In 2003, he returned to Consadole Sapporo, but he rarely played in a match. In 2004, he played for the Regional Leagues club Okinawa Kariyushi FC (2004) and Shizuoka FC (2005-07). He retired at the end of the 2007 season.

Club statistics

References

External links

1980 births
Living people
Association football people from Shizuoka Prefecture
Japanese footballers
J2 League players
Hokkaido Consadole Sapporo players
Mito HollyHock players
Avispa Fukuoka players
Association football midfielders